Hsu Szu-chien is a Taiwanese politician who has served as the Deputy Minister of Foreign Affairs of Taiwan since 16 July 2018.

Education
Hsu obtained his bachelor's degree in political science from National Taiwan University in 1985 and master's and doctoral degrees from Columbia University in the United States in 1990 and 1997 respectively.

Early career
Upon returning from the United States after completing his doctoral degree study, Hsu became the assistant professor in the Institute of Mainland China Studies of Chinese Culture University in 1997–1998. He then became the assistant research fellow of the 3rd Research Center of the Institute of International Relations of National Chengchi University in 1998–2003. He then joined Academia Sinica and became the assistant research fellow of the Preparatory Office for the Institute of Political Science in 2003-2012 and of the Institute of Political Science in 2012–2017. In 2003, he joined National Tsing Hua University to become assistant professor of the Master Program of China Studies until 2017.

References

Living people
Taiwanese Ministers of Foreign Affairs
National Taiwan University alumni
Columbia University alumni
Year of birth missing (living people)